Åmotfors is a bimunicipal locality situated in Eda Municipality and Arvika Municipality, Värmland County, Sweden with 1,410 inhabitants in 2010.

References 

Populated places in Värmland County
Populated places in Arvika Municipality
Populated places in Eda Municipality